was a Japanese waka poet of the mid-Heian period. One of his poems was included in the Ogura Hyakunin Isshu. He left a private waka collection, the Sanekata-shū.

Biography 
Sanekata was a great-grandson of Fujiwara no Tadahira, "and commander of the bodyguard." He was raised by his uncle, .

He was reportedly a lover of Sei Shōnagon, and exchanged love poems with many women.

He was appointed governor of Mutsu Province, and he died while in service there.

He died in 998.

Poetry 
Sixty-seven of his poems were included in imperial anthologies from the Shūi Wakashū on, and he was listed as one of the Late Classical Thirty-Six Immortals of Poetry.

The following poem by him was included as No. 51 in Fujiwara no Teika's Ogura Hyakunin Isshu:

References

Bibliography 
McMillan, Peter. 2010 (1st ed. 2008). One Hundred Poets, One Poem Each. New York: Columbia University Press. 
Suzuki Hideo, Yamaguchi Shin'ichi, Yoda Yasushi. 2009 (1st ed. 1997). Genshoku: Ogura Hyakunin Isshu. Tokyo: Bun'eidō.

External links 
List of Sanekata's poems  in the International Research Center for Japanese Studies's online waka database.
Sanekata-shū  in the same database.
Fujiwara no Sanekata on Kotobank.

10th-century Japanese people
10th-century Japanese poets
People of Heian-period Japan
Fujiwara clan
Japanese nobility
Articles containing Japanese poems
Hyakunin Isshu poets